Club Deportivo Ferroviarios de Chile is a Chilean Football club based in Estacion Central, Santiago. They currently play at the fifth level of Chilean football, the Tercera B.

History
The club was founded on July 14, 1916, by railroad workers in the Barrio San Eugenio; and on February 23, 1950, when they merged with Santiago Badminton, until 1969 they were known as Ferrobadminton. Badminton then decided to undo the merger and moved to Curicó.

In 1980, the club moved to Talagante and adopted the name of Talagante-Ferro. In 1982 was renamed as Ferroviarios.

Honours

 División de Honor Amateur (DIVHA): 3
 1947, 1948, 1949
 Cuarta División: 1
 2003

1 season in Primera División
14 seasons in Primera B
12 seasons in Tercera División
17 seasons in Cuarta División

Records
Record Primera División victory — 7–1 v. Morning Star (1934)
Record Primera División defeat — 0–6 v. Colo-Colo (1934)
Primera División Best Position  — 9th (1934)

External links
Official website 

1916 establishments in Chile
Association football clubs established in 1916
Football clubs in Chile